Andrejová is a village and municipality in Bardejov District in the Prešov Region of Slovakia. The predominant religion is the Greek Catholic Church with 4.9% Eastern Orthodox. The Catholic Church of Virgin Mary the Protectrice of 1893 can be found in the village. The village lies at an altitude of 325 metres and covers an area of 11.679 km2. It has a population of about 362 inhabitants. The village is about 51% Slovak, 20% Rusyn, 16% Romany and 11% Ukrainian with minorities. The village used to have public library. There is a football pitch and volleyball playground.

Genealogical resources
The records for genealogical research are available at the state archive "Statny Archiv in Presov, Slovakia"

 Roman Catholic church records (births/marriages/deaths): 1695-1895
 Greek Catholic church records (births/marriages/deaths): 1831-1900 (parish A)
 Census records 1869 of Andrejova are not available at the state archive. 
 Census records 1857 of Andrejova are available at the state archive.

See also
 List of municipalities and towns in Slovakia

References

External links
 
 
http://en.e-obce.sk/obec/andrejova/andrejova.html
Surnames of living people in Andrejova

Villages and municipalities in Bardejov District
Šariš